Myanglung is a municipality and the district headquarters of Terhathum District of Province No. 1 in eastern Nepal. The municipality is situated at an elevation of about 1500 metres above sea level. Myanglung was converted into a municipality from a village development committee on 18 May 2014, merging the existing village development committees of Myanglung, Piple, Jirikhimti, Ambung, Sabla and Tamphula. According to the census of 2011 the total population of Myanglung is 19,659 including five VDCs.

Tourism
A lake or pond called Chichi lung is situated at Deurali Dada, TMJ Hilltop, and is known as the capital of rhododendrons.  Hyatrung Waterfall (Nepali:हयातरूङ झरना) is the highest or longest waterfall in Nepal and the second highest in Asia, and is situated in Ishibu. A tea garden situated at Solma is also a popular tourist destination in Myanglung.

References

Populated places in Tehrathum District
Nepal municipalities established in 2014
Municipalities in Koshi Province
Municipalities in Tehrathum District